Singles Collection: 2008–2011 is a box set by American rock band the Gaslight Anthem which was released on June 18, 2013. The box set contains nine black vinyl 7" singles packaged in a wooden box and feature the band's singles from 2008 to 2011 along with live recordings, acoustic sessions and B-sides. The box set was limited to only 2,500 copies.

Track listing
All songs written and composed by Brian Fallon, Alex Rosamilia, Alex Levine, and Benny Horowitz, except where noted

Personnel
Band
 Brian Fallon – lead vocals, guitar
 Alex Rosamilia – guitar, backing vocals, 
 Alex Levine – bass guitar, backing vocals
 Benny Horowitz – drums

References

The Gaslight Anthem albums
2013 compilation albums
SideOneDummy Records compilation albums